The 1997–98 NCAA Division II men's ice hockey season began in October 1997 and concluded on March 14 of the following year. This was the 26th season of second-tier college ice hockey.

Regular season

Standings

Note: the records of teams who were members of Division III conferences during the season can be found here.

1998 NCAA Tournament

Note: * denotes overtime period(s)Note: Mini-games in italics

See also
 1997–98 NCAA Division I men's ice hockey season
 1997–98 NCAA Division III men's ice hockey season

References

External links

 
NCAA